Shotton may refer to:

Places
England
 Shotton, Northumberland, a village in the county of Northumberland
 Shotton, Peterlee, a village in County Durham
 Shotton, Sedgefield, a village in County Durham
 Shotton Colliery, a village in County Durham

Wales
 Shotton, Flintshire, a community in the county of Flintshire, which is served by 
Shotton railway station, serving Shotton, Flintshire

Other uses
 Shotton (surname)